Hilary Meredith is an English solicitor, professor and lobbyist known for her work and advocacy for UK armed forces service personnel and their families. In 1987, Meredith came to notice for bringing the first ever case against the Ministry of Defence, where she represented the widow of a soldier who had been killed on manoeuvres in Canada.

She started Hilary Meredith Solicitors, a legal firm in 2003, specializing in campaigning for the armed forces.  Meredith has been known for a series of cases concerning the MoD’s duty of care. She has been involved in Parliamentary Defence Select Sub-Committee Inquiries providing evidence regarding military training exercises.
 
From 2016, she was appointed senior lecturer of Law and Veterans Affairs at Chester University, serving on the board of the University’s Steering Committee for the Westminster Centre for Veterans Wellbeing and Care. In 2017, she also became a Visiting Professor at the University of Chester.

Notable cases
Meredith's work has included:
 Green v MoD - against the Ministry of Defence following the Repeal of S10 Crown Proceedings (Armed Forces) Act 1947.
 Sharp v Ministry of Defence - [2007] EWCA Civ 1223.
 Markey v MoD -  military boxing match resulting in brain injury.
 Maloney Dickinson v MoD – husband drowned whilst abseiling.
 Susan Johnson v MoD - husband killed when flare exploded in his mouth. 
 Shaun Fowler v MoD – severe head injury sustained whilst taking part in riot training in Spandau.
 Judicial Review of the Legal Aid Board Multi Party Committee 1997.
 John Oral v MoD – Gulf War 1, hit by landmine.

References

Date of birth missing (living people)
Living people
Academics of the University of Chester
English solicitors
Year of birth missing (living people)